Roulette of the Cradle is an album by German jazz saxophonist Ingrid Laubrock, which was recorded in 2014 and released on the Swiss Intakt label. It was the third recording by her Anti-House quintet, the first band that she formed on her relocation to New York with guitarist Mary Halvorson, pianist Kris Davis, bassist John Hébert and drummer Tom Rainey. They are joined by clarinetist Oscar Noriega on two tracks.

Reception
The All About Jazz review by John Sharpe states "Each cut abounds with abrupt switches in mood and tone delivered with such aplomb and invention that rather than seeming forced, the changes take on an aura of inevitability. Such richness means that there is delight to be found in close attention to the detail and each encounter reveals more of the underpinning without completely explaining the magic."

Track listing
All compositions by Ingrid Laubrock
 "That's All She Wrote" – 2:43
 "Roulette of the Cradle" – 10:19
 "Face the Piper, Part 1" – 3:57
 "Face the Piper, Part 2" – 5:06
 "Silence... (for Monika)" – 3:40
 "...and Light (for Izumi)" – 8:02
 "From Farm Girl to Fabulous, Vol. II" – 8:44
 "Red Hook" – 7:51

Personnel
Ingrid Laubrock – tenor sax, soprano sax
Mary Halvorson – guitar
Kris Davis – piano
John Hébert – bass
Tom Rainey – drums
Oscar Noriega – clarinet on 5 & 6

References

 

2015 albums
Ingrid Laubrock albums
Intakt Records albums